Esteban Miguel Ángeles Cerón (born 8 February 1946) is a Mexican politician affiliated with the Institutional Revolutionary Party. As of 2006, he served as Senator of the LVIII and LIX Legislatures of the Mexican Congress representing Hidalgo and as Deputy during the LVII Legislature.

References

1946 births
Living people
Politicians from Hidalgo (state)
Members of the Senate of the Republic (Mexico)
Members of the Chamber of Deputies (Mexico)
Institutional Revolutionary Party politicians
21st-century Mexican politicians
National Autonomous University of Mexico alumni
Academic staff of Universidad Autónoma del Estado de Hidalgo
Members of the Congress of Hidalgo
20th-century Mexican politicians